Robert Edward Barnes (born April 11, 1974) is a lawyer and founder of Barnes Law LLP, a Los-Angeles-based law firm.

Early life and education

Barnes grew up in East Ridge, Tennessee, attended Grace Baptist Academy, and later received a scholarship to the McCallie School, a private all-male high school. Barnes' father died when he was a child.

He later attended Yale University for two years before transferring to the University of Tennessee at Knoxville in 1994, citing Yale's elitism as the reason behind his decision to switch schools. Barnes graduated from University of Wisconsin Law School.

Career 

Barnes was formerly a partner at the Bernhoft Law Firm. While with Bernhoft in 2008, Barnes served as one of actor Wesley Snipes' criminal defense lawyers. After a federal trial, a jury acquitted Snipes of conspiracy and felony tax evasion but convicted him on three out of six counts of misdemeanor failure to file income tax returns. Judge William Terrell Hodges imposed the maximum sentence of three consecutive one-year terms. The convictions and sentence were upheld on appeal, where Snipes was represented by other counsel.

Barnes represented Ralph Nader in an unsuccessful lawsuit regarding ballot access in his 2004 presidential bid. He represented eight Covington High School students in a lawsuit that was later dismissed. He represented Alex Jones in the defamation lawsuit that resulted from Jones claiming that the 2012 Sandy Hook massacre was a hoax, litigation that resulted in a judgment against Jones.

Barnes was hired as part of Kyle Rittenhouse's defense team following the 2020 Kenosha unrest shooting. He represented bartender Dustin Hice in a sexual assault lawsuit against CNN anchor Don Lemon in 2021, based on a series of allegations that were later retracted.

Barnes also represented Amy Cooper in the Central Park birdwatching incident for the misdemeanor charge of filing a false police report, a charge that was dismissed upon the motion of the prosecutor.

Bet on Trump 

In 2016, Barnes successfully wagered in European betting markets on Donald Trump being elected president of the United States, winning $100,000 USD.

References 

Living people
American lawyers
American YouTubers
University of Tennessee alumni
University of Wisconsin Law School alumni
People from Chattanooga, Tennessee
Tax lawyers
1974 births